Hooni Yongi  are a Korean Trot duo formed in 2011 by Hooni and Yongi.

Career 
Hooni (Choi Myunghoon) debuted as a solo singer in 2002 and became a member of the idol group 'Giyeok in 2004. The group disbanded after 4 years and he quit being a singer. While working as a record producer, In 2010, Hooni happened to meet Yongi (Kim Minjae) who was a travel agent due to business relationships. Hooni suggested to Yongi to form a Trot duo. They debuted in 2011 with the song '1m 1s(1분 1초)'.

Hooni is also a designer and photographer. He has designed countless album covers for various artists such as Kim Ho-joong, Jang Minho, Miljenko Matijevic. They also directed the music video for Yoo Jae-suk's song "Redevelopment of Love (사랑의 재개발)". The music video hits over 4.7 million views on YouTube. Hooni Yongi took one hour to film entire music video that shocked Yoo Jae-suk but result was satisfied the singer. Later Hooni Yongi covered the song with their style and also carol version. 

Since May 2020, Yongi has been the host of Jeonju MBC's 'Oh My Singer'''  following Jang Minho.  

Since signing a seasonal contract with KDH Entertainment in January 2021, they have been actively promoting, such as appearing in 'Gayo Stage' and 'Trot People'. Hooni Yongi has been actively collaborate with other artists, and are currently in forming the project group 'Segasoo' with a trot singer Myungji. 'Segasoo' released a digital single 'Holodaen Sarang(홀로된 사랑). 

 Discography 

Studio album

 Non-stop 7080 (15 January 2016)
 Ballad (Remake album) (9 May 2018)

Extended play 

 Remind'' (Jung 4, 2015)

References 

K-pop music groups
Musical groups established in 2011
South Korean male singers
South Korean boy bands
Trot singers

External links 

 Official Youtube